William H. Houseman  (1859–1894), was a Major League Baseball pitcher for the 1886 Baltimore Orioles. He appeared in one game for the Orioles on September 2, 1886, pitching a complete game. He picked up the loss, allowing three runs and six hits.

External links

1859 births
1894 deaths
Major League Baseball pitchers
Baltimore Orioles (AA) players
19th-century baseball players
Wilmington Blue Hens players
Omaha Omahogs players
Baseball players from Baltimore